Can Altıntığ (born January 1, 1987) is a Turkish professional basketball player for Çayırova Belediyesi of the TB2L.

Altıntığ joined Semt77 Yalovaspor in 2021 and averaged 4.8 points, 3.0 assists and 1.6 rebounds per game.

On January 21, 2022, he signed with Konyaspor.

References

External links
 TBLStat.net Profile
 TBL.org.tr profile
 Eurobasket.com profile

1987 births
Living people
Bahçeşehir Koleji S.K. players
Bandırma B.İ.K. players
Competitors at the 2009 Mediterranean Games
Fenerbahçe men's basketball players
Karşıyaka basketball players
Mediterranean Games bronze medalists for Turkey
Mediterranean Games medalists in basketball
Shooting guards
Sportspeople from Bursa
Tofaş S.K. players
Torku Konyaspor B.K. players
Trabzonspor B.K. players
Turkish men's basketball players
Yalovaspor BK players